Chicken Divan is a chicken casserole usually served with broccoli and Mornay sauce. It was named after the place of its invention, the Divan Parisien Restaurant at Chatham Hotel in New York City where it was served as the signature dish in the early twentieth century. Its creator was a chef named Lagasi. In French, the word divan refers to a meeting place or great hall.

History
There are many historic recipes for Chicken Divan found in cookbooks dating to the late 1950s and early 1960s, but their authenticity is uncertain since the original recipe was kept a secret. An approximation based on hints from the maître d'hôtel of the Divan Parisien is made with poached chicken breasts, broccoli and a cheesy béchamel, or Mornay sauce, enriched with egg yolks.

Types of divan
The dish is now commonly prepared with regular Parmesan cheese and remains one of the most classic American casserole dishes today. A "quick" version can be made with pre-cooked chicken breasts, prepared mayonnaise and canned soup. Some  versions are topped with potato chips, in a manner similar to that of funeral potatoes.

Hart's Turkey Farm in New Hampshire serves a version using turkey instead of chicken.

See also
 List of casserole dishes
 List of regional dishes of the United States

References

American chicken dishes
Casserole dishes
Cheese dishes
Cuisine of New York City